Yulia Evgenievna Galysheva (born 23 October 1992) is a Kazakhstani mogul skier who won three medals at FIS Freestyle Ski World Championships, bronze medal at the 2018 Pyeongchang Olympic Games and two gold medals at the Asian Winter Games in 2011.

Athletic career
Yulia Galysheva has competed at international challenges since March 2006. She debuted at the Europa Cup stage in the Russian Saint-Petersburg. She was 21st in mogul and 18th in dual moguls. In 2007, she competed in FIS Freestyle World Ski Championship at the Madonna di Campiglio, where she finished 22nd in moguls and 21st in dual moguls. In February 2008, she placed second in the German Schliersee at the Europa cup's dual mogul. A few days later, she won two gold medals in moguls and dual moguls at the Swiss Engelberg. In 2010, she competed at the Winter Olympics in Vancouver, where she finished 11th in moguls. Galysheva got her first World Cup victory at the Meribel and was ahead of Hannah Kearney in the final of dual moguls. In 2011, she won gold medals at the 2011 Asian Winter Games in moguls and dual moguls. In 2011, she also won in the Europa cup stage in Jyväskylä. Next year, she became juniors World champion in moguls. Also, she won a silver medal in dual moguls at the Italian Valmalenco. She has three podiums in the season of 2012/13, which includes 3rd place at the American Deer Valley and 3rd and 2nd places at the Swedish Åre. At the 2015 FIS World Freestyle Championships in Krieschberg, Austria, she won her first world championship medal, a bronze in dual moguls, behind the 2014 and 2010 Olympic champions, Justine Dufour Lapointe (silver) and Hannah Kearney (gold). Two years later, at the world championships in Sierra Nevada, she upgraded to silver, behind gold medalist Perrine Laffont and ahead of bronze medalist Jaelin Kauf.

Galysheva won the first world champion title for Kazakh moguls at the FIS Freestyle skiing and Snowboarding Championships 2019. And her Olympic bronze medal at Pyeongchang 2018 is also historical for Kazakh freestyle skiing because it is the first Olympic medal in this sport for Kazakhstan.

Career highlights

Olympic Games
2018 – PyeongChang  3rd, Moguls

FIS Freestyle World Ski Championships
2019 – Utah  1st, Moguls
2017 – Sierra Nevada  2nd, Dual moguls
2021 – Almaty  2nd, Moguls
2015 – Kreischberg  3rd, Dual moguls

FIS Junior World Ski Championships
2011 – Jyväskylä  1st, Moguls
2012 – Valmalenco  1st, Moguls
2012 – Valmalenco  3rd, Dual moguls

Asian Winter Games
2011 – Almaty  1st, Moguls
2011 – Almaty  1st, Dual moguls

World Cup podiums
2010 – Meribel  1st, Dual moguls
2012 – Beida Lake  3rd, Moguls
2013 – Deer Valley  3rd, Dual moguls
2013 – Åre  3rd, Moguls
2013 – Åre  2nd, Dual moguls
2014 – Deer Valley,  2nd, Moguls
2014 – Ruka,  1st, Dual Moguls
2016 – Deer Valley,  2nd, Moguls
2016 – Deer Valley,  2nd, Dual Moguls
2016 – Tazawako,  2nd, Dual Moguls
2017 – Thaiwoo,  2nd, Moguls
2017 – Thaiwoo  1st, Moguls
2018 – Mont-Tremblant,  3rd, Moguls
2018 – Ruka,  2nd, Moguls
2018 – Thaiwoo  3rd, Moguls
2018 – Calgary  1st, Moguls

External links

Living people
1992 births
Kazakhstani female freestyle skiers
Freestyle skiers at the 2010 Winter Olympics
Freestyle skiers at the 2014 Winter Olympics
Freestyle skiers at the 2018 Winter Olympics
Olympic freestyle skiers of Kazakhstan
Sportspeople from Oskemen
Kazakhstani people of Russian descent
Asian Games medalists in freestyle skiing
Freestyle skiers at the 2011 Asian Winter Games
Freestyle skiers at the 2017 Asian Winter Games
Asian Games gold medalists for Kazakhstan
Asian Games silver medalists for Kazakhstan
Medalists at the 2011 Asian Winter Games
Medalists at the 2017 Asian Winter Games
Universiade medalists in freestyle skiing
Medalists at the 2018 Winter Olympics
Olympic bronze medalists for Kazakhstan
Olympic medalists in freestyle skiing
Universiade gold medalists for Kazakhstan
Competitors at the 2015 Winter Universiade
Competitors at the 2017 Winter Universiade
Freestyle skiers at the 2022 Winter Olympics